Fleep is a graphic novel by Jason Shiga. It was originally published in comic strip format in AsianWeek in 2002. It was later collected and published by Sparkplug Comic Books.

Synopsis
Jimmy Yee awakens to find himself trapped in a telephone booth that is buried in concrete, and must figure out what happened before he suffocates.

Reception
The collected Fleep won the 2003 Ignatz Award for Outstanding Story.

Time described Fleep as "ingenious", "far from predictable", and "worthy of Arthur Conan Doyle". The Comics Journal considered its ending to be "quite shocking", and an example of the "strain of nihilism" in Shiga's work.

Publication history
Shaenon K. Garrity has noted that the publishers of AsianWeek had wanted "a comic about the 'Asian-American experience, and were consequently "a little baffled" by Fleep, which fits that description only in that the protagonist is Asian-American. AsianWeek cancelled Fleep mid-story, and Shiga then took it to the Modern Tales webcomics collective.

References

External links

2003 graphic novels
Ignatz Award winners for Outstanding Story